Levi-Montalcini is an Italian surname. Notable people with this surname include:

 Gino Levi-Montalcini, Italian architect and designer
 Rita Levi-Montalcini, Italian Nobel laureate, honored for her work in neurobiology
 Paola Levi-Montalcini, Italian painter

See also 

 Levi (disambiguation)

Italian-language surnames